The 125th Street station is an express station on the IND Eighth Avenue Line of the New York City Subway. Located at the intersection of 125th Street and St. Nicholas Avenue in the Harlem neighborhood of Manhattan, it is served by the A and D trains at all times, by the C train at all times except late nights, and by the B train on weekdays.

Nearby landmarks and points of interest include the Apollo Theater and the Touro College of Osteopathic Medicine.

History
The station opened on September 10, 1932, as part of the city-operated Independent Subway System (IND)'s initial segment, the Eighth Avenue Line between Chambers Street and 207th Street. While the IRT Broadway–Seventh Avenue Line already provided parallel service, the new Eighth Avenue subway via Central Park West and Frederick Douglass Boulevard provided an alternative route.

In 1981, the MTA listed the station among the 69 most deteriorated stations in the subway system. The station was renovated in the 1980s, during which two stairs to each platform at the north end were removed and the platforms' original white floor tiling was replaced. The station was damaged in a water main break in 1989. Another renovation later restored the closed staircases and made the station ADA-accessible with the installation of elevators near the middle of the platforms.

On June 27, 2017, a southbound A train derailed just north of the station. This derailment, caused by improperly secured replacement rails, left 34 passengers injured.

Station layout

The outer track wall tiles have a Prussian green trim line with a black border with small "125" signs in white lettering on a black background beneath it. Both platforms have one line of green I-beam columns that run at regular intervals for their entire length except for a small section at either ends. Every other column has the standard black station name plate in white lettering.

The station has a mezzanine above the tracks at the Southern end and platforms that connect both fare control areas at either ends. There are five staircases to each platform and large-scale photos of Harlem in the 1920s and 1930s.

The next express station to the south, 59th Street–Columbus Circle, is 3.35 miles (5.391 km) away with seven local stations in between, which is the longest distance between two express stops in the system.

Exits

The full-time fare control area is at the south end of the mezzanine, serving the 125th Street exits, and has a turnstile bank and token booth. It serves the exits at St. Nicholas Avenue and West 125th Street. The other fare control area at the north end, serving the 127th Street exits, is unstaffed, containing full height turnstiles. There is also evidence of closed exit stairs going up to 126th Street and 124th Street, one on each side of both mezzanines. One of the staircases led directly into the basement of a business that existed at street level.

 One stair, NW corner of St. Nicholas Avenue and West 125th Street
 One stair, NE corner of St. Nicholas Avenue and West 125th Street
  One stair and one elevator, SW corner of St. Nicholas Avenue and West 125th Street
 One stair, SE corner of St. Nicholas Avenue and West 125th Street
 One stair, SW corner of St. Nicholas Avenue and West 127th Street
 One stair, SE corner of St. Nicholas Avenue and West 127th Street

References

External links 

 
 Station Reporter — A Lefferts
 Station Reporter — A Rockaway
 Station Reporter — B Train
 Station Reporter — C Train
 Station Reporter — D Train
 The Subway Nut — 125th Street Pictures 
 125th Street entrance at southwest corner from Google Maps Street View
 127th Street entrance at southwest corner from Google Maps Street View
 Platforms from Google Maps Street View

IND Eighth Avenue Line stations
New York City Subway stations in Manhattan
Railway stations in the United States opened in 1932
Harlem
1932 establishments in New York City